Radiation and Environmental Biophysics is a quarterly peer-reviewed scientific journal covering research in biophysics and radiation biology. It is published by Springer Science+Business Media and the editors-in-chief are Anna A. Friedl (Ludwig-Maximilian University), Werner Rühm (Helmholtz Zentrum München), and Andrzej Wojcik (Stockholm University).

It was established in 1974, by continuing in part the former title Biophysik.

Abstracting and indexing 
The journal is abstracted and indexed in:
 Chemical Abstracts Service
 Index Medicus/MEDLINE/PubMed
 Science Citation Index Expanded
 Current Contents/Life Sciences
 BIOSIS Previews
 Scopus

According to the Journal Citation Reports, the journal has a 2020 impact factor of 1.925.

References

External links 
 

Radiology and medical imaging journals
Springer Science+Business Media academic journals
English-language journals
Quarterly journals
Publications established in 1974